David Hayman is a New Zealand-based epizootic epidemiologist and disease ecologist whose general multi-disciplinary work focuses on the maintenance of infectious diseases within their hosts and the process of emergence and transmission to humans specifically related to bats. He has gathered data on the relationship between ecological degradation due to anthropogenic actions, and increased pathogen emergence in humans and animals. During COVID-19 he was involved as an expert in several international collaborations, some convened by the World Health Organization, and was a regular commentator in the New Zealand media about the country's response to the pandemic. He has had lead roles in research organisations at Massey University and Te Pūnaha Matatini and was the recipient of the 2017 Rutherford Discovery Fellowship Award. Since 2014 Hayman has been a professor at Massey University.

Education and career
Hayman began studying Veterinary Medicine and Surgery at the University of Edinburgh in 1996 and graduated with a Bachelor of Veterinary Medicine and Surgery in 2002. He gained an MSc in Conservation Biology at the University of Kent in 2005, completed a Doctor of Philosophy in Veterinary Science at the University of Cambridge in 2011 and postdoctoral training in infectious disease biology at Colorado University.

After qualifying as a veterinary surgeon in 2002, Hayman mixed general veterinary practice in the UK with wildlife work, largely in the tropics.
Since 2014, he has been a professor of Infectious Disease ecology at Massey University New Zealand, where he co-directs a large research team, the Molecular Epidemiology and Public Health Laboratory (mEpiLab) which is part of a World Organisation for Animal Health(OIE) Collaborating Centre for Veterinary Epidemiology and Public Health. He is the Director of the Infectious Disease Research Centre (IDREC) and a Principal Investigator at Te Pūnaha Matatini.

Selected research

Bats as a natural reservoir of infection
By developing and applying research techniques to predict and understand specific environments in which an infectious pathogen naturally lives and reproduces, Hayman's work has informed understanding of the  persistence, adaption and diversification of the pathogens within an animal host and how this is affected by other dynamics such as seasonal birthing and death rates, and ultimately causing the emergence of the pathogen in new hosts. The aim of these research studies was to understand when, how and why globally important pathogens emerged and caused disease, and [to] "provide advice on how to prevent the spread to humans."

2008 research in which Hayman was involved, investigates the presence of Lagos bat virus (LBV)–specific antibodies in Megachiroptera from West Africa. Neutralizing antibodies were detected in Eidolon helvum (37%), Epomophorus gambianus (3%), and Epomops buettikoferi (33%, 2/6) from Ghana. These findings confirm the presence of LBV in West Africa. Hayman collaborated in a 2011 research project that looked at wildlife populations on isolated islands to determine the persistence of viruses in these circumstances. Specifically, the straw-coloured fruit bat, Eidolon helvum, which has been identified as carrying henipaviruses and Lagos bat virus were sampled on an island in the Gulf of Guinea and neutralising antibodies were confirmed. The study, co-authored by Hayman, concludes that researching isolated populations present a "unique and valuable opportunity to further our understanding of the maintenance of viruses in wildlife populations...[but]...further studies are required to bring anecdotal theory and empirical data together to understand fully how viruses which are considered to be acute and immunising may be maintained in small populations."

In 2012, Hayman was part of an interdisciplinary research team that developed a framework for studying the emergence of zoonotic diseases, particularly those arising from bats. The study holds that understanding the relationship between healthy ecosystems and healthy humans is crucial if there are to be appropriate responses that would conserve wildlife and habitat and minimize spillover infection from wild animals to human.

Hayman contributed to a 2012 study that explores the fertility, mortality and migration of the Straw-coloured fruit bat (Eidolon helvum) in Ghana because of their proximity to humans and evidence of possible infection with zoonotic viruses. The research shows that E. helvum were widespread across sub-Saharan Africa and that it is important to continue establishing demographic parameters to gain good understanding of potential dynamics.

Hayman was involved in research in 2013 that explores the extent to which emerging infectious diseases originating in wildlife, posed a threat to humans and animals. The study gathered serologic data on the ecology of these infectious diseases by considering the "pathogen, animal hosts that are naturally infected by the pathogen and the ecological interactions which facilitate pathogen perpetuation in nature." The paper, co-authored by Hayman, hold that "models can guide appropriate disease surveillance, prevention, and control strategies...[and present concepts]...that may yet be unknown or overlooked by ecologists, modelers, and policy makers." A hypothesis that bats are unique in their ability to host zoonotic viruses compared to rodents was investigated by a team including Hayman, in 2013. The study, in concluding that this was the case, also identifies  "important life-history and ecological predictors of zoonotic viral richness for both bats and rodents."

Acknowledging bats host viruses that can impact human and animal health, a 2014 study, to which Hayman contributed, explores the dynamics of infections in bats to gain more understanding of the risk of exposure to spillover hosts. While the paper concludes more work needs to be done on detecting viruses, it notes that longitudinal studies of bat populations show evidence of some viral shedding events at certain stages of their life cycle and these could be predicted by the seroconversions observed during this study.

A study authored by Hayman in 2016 identifies bats (order Chiroptera) as hosts of a range of viruses that can affect humans and be a threat to global security. The paper records the findings of a review of all viral families detected globally in bat populations and notes the importance of understanding bats as viral reservoirs and identifying future areas of research.

In 2021, he was involved in research that aimed to identify factors that might inform the prediction of the most likely source of the next possible coronavirus pandemic. The spread of rhinolophid bats was mapped across the world and changes to ecological dynamics caused by human population increases and intervention such as removing forests, and high cropping and livestock density were examined.

Public policy positions
Much of Hayman's work has been focused on developing integrated approaches to public health and environmental protection that could prevent infectious disease outbreaks which are a threat to global security. He has worked in teams that promote raising awareness of how human activities can effect dynamics within bat populations, and therefore, increase exposure to the risk of infections. One study notes the necessity of field and laboratory studies that clarify how bat ecology and interactions with humans are likely to affect the dynamics of bat viruses so that policies and strategies can be developed to mitigate this risk. Another article, written by Hayman in 2016, notes that the way the West African Ebola crisis have been managed gives cause for concern and the high fatality rate shows the need for the financing of improved healthcare infrastructures, particularly in vulnerable countries. The paper holds that while it is about building the capacity to quickly detect and respond to an outbreak, the bigger issue is preventing outbreaks in the first place, and this requires a change in societal attitudes to the impact on the environment of increased human population density, travel and encroachment into the habit. He concludes: The need for linking environmental and human health has never been greater, and it requires an informed, well-funded, science-driven approach to find synergies between those interested in both human and environmental health. But to end with a question: if we value both nature and our health, can we as a society be bold enough to move towards a world where conservation acts as vaccination?

By 2017 Hayman was publishing papers that challenged a research focus into bat-associated diseases that did not give due weight to how anthropogenic changes to the environment could influence human health through their impact on bat ecology and the viruses within bat populations. One paper critically examined the research efforts in Australia that had focused on why interactions between people and livestock had resulted in infections by novel bat viruses such as Menangle viruses. The paper co-authored by Hayman concluded that the work of the Australian team had provided useful models to build understandings of how bat-viral ecology interacts with anthropogenic change and the findings would help develop appropriate actions being taken "to mitigate the drivers of viral spillover."

2018 research in which Hayman collaborated, developed a model framework to assist in understanding how the effect of human encroachment into natural habitats is related to the emergence of novel infectious diseases. The paper concluded that such frameworks provide guiding principles for policymakers when developing land-use strategies that "enable common ground to be established between species conservation and novel disease emergence risk mitigation...[and results]...suggest that it is possible to identify high-risk areas for the mitigation and surveillance of novel disease emergence and that mitigation measures may reduce this risk while conserving biodiversity." This research assumed significance during COVID-19 because, while researchers internationally agreed that the pandemic was likely to have been the caused after one person was infected with the virus from an animal, the risk of infectious disease emergence from wildlife and pandemics was determined largely by human behaviours such as urbanization, changes in diet and agricultural practices as a result of increases in population numbers. The research aimed to inform early warning and preparedness by identifying processes that "increase disease emergence risk and locations where this is occurring."

In 2019 Hayman co-authored a paper that acknowledged the considerable financial investment in infectious disease research but noted that there were challenges in sharing scientific data before and during emergencies.  The article considered the "landscape" of stakeholders who were involved in this and concluded that there needed to be improved communication between researchers and policy makers so that gaps in knowledge were identified and decision-makers could develop policies to prevent, detect and respond effectively to current or future outbreaks.

New Zealand studies
There was an alert in August 2016 in the town of [[Havelock North]], New Zealand of an "increase in people with diarrheal illness, elevated campylobacteriosis notifications from the region and an increase in school absenteeism...[and]...routine microbiological testing [had shown] the Havelock North reticulated water supply was positive for E. coli."  A paper, co-authored by Hayman, [described] "the epidemiologic and molecular investigation into the source and magnitude of the outbreak and discussed the public health response initiated to prevent similar events from occurring in the future."

Hayman was part of team that researched the geographical distribution and spatial patterns of Cryptosporidiosis and Giardiasis within New Zealand to see if there were differences in variants within an island system and the rest of the world. Because Cryptosporidiosis and Giardiasis were recognised as significant enteric diseases the study aimed to get an "overview of local and global protozoan genotype diversity."  The research concluded that the species and variants found in an island were no different from other countries and this was most likely due to gene flow through widespread human travel and high numbers of cattle and people as host populations. It was noted that while species and genotypes are widely distributed, "new variants will arise when sampling effort increase, and their dispersal will be facilitated by human activity...[suggesting]...that geographical distribution of species and genotypes within Cryptosporidium and Giardia parasites may yield important clues for designing effective surveillance strategies and identification of factors driving within and cross species transmission."

Between 1998 and 2012 an outbreak of Salmonella (DT160) affected more than 3,000 humans and killed wild birds in New Zealand despite the disease not being recorded in the country before that.  A 2017 study involving Hayman took a comparative genomic approach to understand how and why the outbreak happened. The paper concluded that DT160 was introduced into New Zealand on a single occasion from 1996 through 1998 and propagated across the country with evidence showing transmission between humans, poultry, cattle and wild birds as host groups.

COVID-19

Commentary
As the COVID-19 outbreak began unfolding in 2020 Hayman became a regular commentator in the New Zealand media. When there was discussion in 2020 about the origins of the COVID-19 pandemic, Hayman said the original ancestry of the virus was most likely in bats and close contact with people in places such as the Wuhan Market could have led to the ongoing infection and transmission between people with a high case fatality rate. He noted that these kinds of viruses frequently mutated and COVID-19 was "disconcerting...and could get better at transmitting between people."  He noted that similar outbreaks had been stopped in the past. In a further interview for Radio New Zealand Hayman reiterated that while it was not fully established the disease had come from bats or snakes, it had been traced to Wuhan without any confirmation of the animal that had passed on the infection. He suggested that because bats can have a very high core body temperature and this replicates what happens to humans when they get an infection, a virus passed on from bats could continue to grow in people and the body's normal defenses like a rising temperature or other immunity mechanisms, may be ineffective in resisting the virus. He advised in general for people to keep their distance from wild animals.

As New Zealand went into full lockdown in March 2020 Hayman told Kathryn Ryan on Radio New Zealand there was a danger of people underestimating how quickly COVID-19 could spread and noted that overseas experience had shown cases can double every three days. In the same interview he said this was frightening and could result in an overload on the health system, but the spread could be stopped if people acted responsibly by washing their hands and practicing [social distancing.

At the end of 2020 Hayman said that it was still early days for the virus and while New Zealand had controlled the spread of the virus to that point, the country needed to be "patient and vigilant" and he looked forward to the increased uptake of the vaccines. As New Zealand moved from an elimination of the virus to a suppression approach, Hayman commented in October 2021 that this had not been totally effective in other countries and cited the United Kingdom which had high rates of infection and a strain on their health system.  He said that COVID-19 was a vaccine-preventable disease, and the key was to get high rates of vaccination quickly to "stop transmission, stop people dying, but also manage the healthcare system."
When a new animal virus was passed to humans in China in June 2021, Hayman said that these will emerge the more humans encroach wildlife habitats, noting that "this loss of habitat is increasing the chances that humans interact with bats harbouring potentially pathogenic SARS-related coronaviruses."

Collaborative international responses
In 2020 Hayman was one of 22 international experts who worked with contributors from the Convention on Biological Diversity, the Intergovernmental Panel on Climate Change, the Convention on International Trade in Endangered Species, the United Nations Convention to Combat Desertification, and the World Health Organization to produce a report commissioned by the Intergovernmental Science-Policy Platform on Biodiversity and Ecosystem Services (IPBES) that documented interactions between biodiversity and human drivers of disease emergence. Recommendations made by the report included having more disease-risk health assessments in  public  projects, governments budgeting adequately for the economic costs of pandemics, stopping the international trade of high-risk species and valuing the knowledge of indigenous peoples and local communities to inform pandemic prevention programmes. Hayman said the goal of the team was to make the link between factors causing biodiversity crises, and those causing infections to go from wildlife to people. In an interview in the New Zealand media, Hayman said of the report [that] "we showed the same things causing the biodiversity loss and extinction of species are also leading to coronavirus novel infections, things like consuming lots of wildlife or putting roads in tropical forests." He later contributed to a workshop, The IPBES Bureau and Multidisciplinary Expert Panel, Platform Workshop.

In June 2021, Hayman was named as one of 26 international experts selected from a group of 700 applicants to be part of the One Health High Level Expert Panel (OHHLEP), an international collaboration established following a meeting at the Paris Peace Forum in November 2020.  This panel acknowledged that COVID-19 had shown the vulnerabilities and interconnections of the health of humans and animals and aimed to take an "integrative and systemic approach to health, grounded on the understanding that human health is closely linked to the healthiness of food, animals and the environment, and the healthy balance of their impact on the ecosystems they share everywhere in the world." This multidisciplinary initiative was supported by the Food and Agriculture Organization (FAO), the World Organisation for Animal Health (OIE), the United Nations Environment Programme (UNEP) and the World Health Organization (WHO), to provide "policy relevant scientific assessment on the emergence of health crises arising from the human-animal-ecosystem interface...[and]...guidance on development of a long-term strategic approach to reducing the risk of zoonotic pandemics, with an associated monitoring and early warning framework." Hayman said the expert panel had been influenced by the  IPBES report that built understanding of the complex interrelatedness of disease and the environment and "addressed these issues in a transdisciplinary way", and described the work  as being about recognising the interrelatedness of people and the rest of the planet and understanding that the health of humans, animals and the environment are all interlinked.

He was selected as part of an international team set up by the World Health Organisation to investigate the origins of SARs-CoV-2 which had been discovered first in Wuhan. When the team was given clearance to go to China in January 2021 Hayman was unable to attend in person due to issues in getting a booking in managed isolation on his return to New Zealand but continued to contribute to the work. The Final Joint Report noted that the molecular epidemiology team, of which Hayman was a member, "examined the genomic data of viruses collected from animals...[and]...evidence from surveys and targeted studies so far have shown that the coronaviruses most highly related to SARS-CoV-2 are found in bats and pangolins suggesting that these mammals may be the reservoir of the virus that causes COVID-19...[but not necessarily]...its direct progenitor." The New Zealand Government acknowledged the work done by the team of experts
and that the report "helpfully highlighted the critical importance of the One Health approach between human health and animal health regulatory agencies, shining a spotlight on an area that deserves greater attention." Hayman, along with other members of the expert team, was one of the co-authors of an article in Nature in August 2021 that urged further action on  getting key scientific studies to assist in determining the origins of SARs-CoV-2.  The article noted that time delays would affect the feasibility of getting trace-back of people and animals inside and outside China due to the wane of antibodies.

Fellowships and memberships
Hayman was a recipient of the Rutherford Discovery Fellowship in 2017  for research entitled: 'From individuals to populations: multi-scale approaches to pathogen emergence'. This annual fellowship, funded by the Ministry of Business, Innovation and Employment was "designed to support talented early- to mid-career researchers." His research was in three parts: exploring how demography of the host affected when infections might emerge; determining how different types of infection affected the likelihood of an infection emerging; and finding how  a spread might be influenced by the physiology of the host. Referring to this research, Jamie Morton in the New Zealand Herald noted: "What Dr David Hayman discovers could help us better understand how many of the worst infectious diseases on the planet – Ebola, HIV/Aids and pandemic influenza among them – transfer from their animal hosts."

Since 2014 Hayman has been a diplomate at the European College of Zoological Medicine.

In 2007 he was awarded a Cambridge Infectious Diseases Consortium Fellowship at Cambridge University UK, and initiated a research project on bat viral infections with zoonotic potential in West Africa. Later as a graduate student, Hayman was as a member of the Cambridge team in a Science Live Festival in London in 2011 focussing on the Straw-coloured fruit bat.

Hayman was a Visiting Post-doctoral Researcher at Colorado State University, USA between 2011 and 2012 and 2012 to 2014 a David H. Smith Conservation Research Fellow at the same university where he focused on gaining understanding of how a fungus White-nose syndrome was impacting the survival of some species of North American hibernating bats.

He was a Wellcome Trust Research Training Fellow at the University of Cambridge from 2009 to 2012. 

Between 2010 and 2015 Hayman was a research associate at the John E. Fogarty International Center National Institutes of Health.

Hayman is a PhD alumni of the Institute of Zoology (IoZ) where he was a visiting researcher from 2007 to 2011.

Awards
Hayman was awarded the UK Veterinary Student of the Year Award in 2002.

In recognition of his work during COVID-19 in studying the virus and providing clear information to the New Zealand public, Hayman was named the 2020 Manawatū Standard Person of the Year.

References

Living people
New Zealand epidemiologists
Academic staff of the Massey University
21st-century New Zealand scientists
Veterinary scientists
Year of birth missing (living people)